Michelle Potter AM (born 18 November 1944) is an Australian dance writer, critic, archivist, and curator of historical materials. Her research and writing have focused on but have not been restricted to Australian dance history. She is known internationally for the extent of her knowledge and expertise. She was honoured for her achievements with the award of Member of the Order of Australia (AM) in the 2023 Australia Day Honours List.

Early life and training
Born in Sydney, Michelle Anne Potter became interested in dance in her youth, after seeing a performance by the Borovansky Ballet. She began her dance training with Joan and Monica Halliday in her hometown, then went on for further study with jazz dancer and teacher Ronne Arnold and Valrene Tweedie, a pioneer in Australia of the Cecchetti method of ballet training. She also studied acting and theater techniques at the Mina Shelley School of the Theatre in Sydney, a well-known school for professional performers. Having become an accomplished dancer by the time she was 15, she determined to get an early start in her theatrical career.

Dancer and choreographer
Potter began her professional career in 1959 performing in Aladdin, a Christmas pantomime directed by Maurice Sullivan and Mina Shelley, and continued to work in the Sullivan-Shelley shows for the next few years. In the mid-1960s she worked with Valrene Tweedie's choreographic ensemble, Ballet Australia, performing in both full-scale productions and in choreographic workshop performances.

In the 1970s and 1980s, after earning a bachelor's degree with honours in social anthropology and receiving a diploma in education from Sydney University, Potter moved to Canberra and taught ballet technique and creative movement classes for Janet Karin and Bryan Lawrence at the National Capital Ballet School. During these years, she tried her hand at choreography, creating Court Serenade (1975), to music by Delibes for National Capital Dancers; Orpheus and Eurydice (1977), to music by Gluck, for Canberra Opera; and Morning Prayer (1978) for St. James Church in Curtin, A.C.T. She also appeared in several productions by the National Capital Dancers, including The Nutcracker and Giselle.

Dance historian and filmmaker
In the 1980s, Potter returned to academia and earned a second undergraduate degree with honours in art history and subsequently a doctorate in art history and dance history at the Australian National University. She was the National Library of Australia's Esso Fellow in the Performing Arts between 1988 and 1990 and Australian National University's Janet Wilkie Memorial Scholar for 1989, which gave her study time in New York. The focus of her research over the years has ranged from the history of the Wassily de Basil's Ballets Russes in Australia, with particular emphasis on the designers of sets and costumes, to contemporary masters such as Merce Cunningham, whose work with John Cage, Robert Rauschenberg, and Jasper Johns was the subject of her doctoral dissertation. She has also done intensive study on Robert Helpmann and on Pina Bausch.

In 1996, Potter curated the National Library of Australia's exhibition entitled Dance People Dance, which toured Australia under a Visions of Australia grant until 1999. Between 1997 and 2001, Potter was manager of the Keep Dancing! project at the National Film and Sound Archive. As part of that project, she co-scripted, researched, and produced two video documentaries and a film:
 1999. An Avalanche of Dancing: The Ballets Russes in Australia, 1936-1940. A documentary drawing on archival film footage of the Ballets Russes tours to Australia shot by Dr. Joseph Ringland Anderson and Dr. Ewan Murray Will between 1936 and 1940.
 2001. Boro's Ballet: The Making of an Australian Ballet, 1939-1961. Tells the story of the colourful Czech-Australian Edouard Borovansky and his dream of establishing an Australian ballet company.
 2002. The Australian Ballet: Opening Act, 1962-1972. Documents the early days of the Australian Ballet, its first stars, and its well-known guest artists, including Margot Fonteyn and Rudolf Nureyev.

Dance writer and critic
Potter has been writing about dance since 1990. Her articles and reviews have been published in a range of journals, magazines, programs, and newspapers in Australia, the United States, the United Kingdom, and Germany. Among them are The Australian (Sydney), Ballet News (Melbourne), Brolga: An Australian Journal about Dance (Canberra), Choreography and Dance: An International Journal (London), Dance Australia (Sydney), Dance Chronicle: Studies in Dance and the Related Arts (New York), Dance Research: The Journal of the Society for Dance Research (Edinburgh), Dancing Times (London), and Jahresmittlungen van Tanzplan Deutschland (Berlin). Her writing has also been published as chapters in numerous anthologies and catalogs, notably those related to the Ballets Russes published by the National Gallery of Australia. She is the sole author of seven books:
 1991. A Full House: The Esso Guide to the Performing Arts Collections of the National Library of Australia. With an introduction by Robyn Archer. Canberra: National Library of Australia.
 1997. A Passion for Dance. Canberra: National Library of Australia. Includes discussion of dancers Stephen Baynes, Maina Gielgud, Padma Menon, Paul Mercurio, Graeme Murphy, Gideon Obarzanek, Stephen Page, Meryl Tankard, Natalie Weir, and Stanton Welch.
 2002. A Collector's Book of Australian Dance. Canberra: National Library of Australia. An album of dance photographs from the Dance Collection of the National Library of Australia, with an introductory essay on the nature of dance photography.
 2012. Meryl Tankard: An Original Voice. Canberra: Dance Writing and Research. A biography of a director and choreographer whose theatrical works transcended the boundaries of dance, theater, and the visual arts.
 2014. Dame Maggie Scott: A Life in Dance. With a foreword by Graeme Murphy. Melbourne: Text Publishing Company. A biography of Margaret Scott, one of the most influential and most beloved figures in Australian dance history.
2020. Kristian Fredrikson. Designer. With a foreword by Maina Gielgud. Melbourne: Melbourne Books. A biography of a New Zealand-born designer for dance, opera, theatre and film and television with a list of his works made from the 1960s until his death in 2005.
2022. Glimpses of Graeme. Reflections on the work of Graeme Murphy. Hobart: FortySouth Publishing. A selection of reviews and articles about Australian choreographer Graeme Murphy arranged according to themes that are noticeable in Murphy’s works.

Potter is the founder of two notable media dedicated to dissemination of information about dance history and current performances. In 1994, she founded Brolga: An Australian Journal about Dance  and continued to edit it until mid-2006.  A few years later, in 2009, she established a personal website, Michelle Potter … on dancing (https://michellepotter.org), as an additional outlet for her writing and reviews.

Curator of dance materials
In 2002, Potter was appointed inaugural curator of dance at the National Library of Australia. In this post she recorded over one hundred oral history interviews with eminent Australians working in the arts. She was also one of the original team of investigators for the research project Ballets Russes in Australia: Our Cultural Revolution, a four-year collaborative partnership of the Australian Ballet, the University of Adelaide, and the National Library of Australia, which began in 2005.

In 2006, Potter left the National Library to move to the United States and take up an appointment as curator of the Jerome Robbins Dance Division of the New York Public Library for the Performing Arts at Lincoln Center, a position she held until 2008. During this appointment, she co-curated Invention: Merce Cunningham and Collaborators, a major retrospective exhibition for the New York Public Library in June 2007.

Since returning to Australia in 2008 Potter has worked as an independent dance writer and critic.

Awards
Potter was made a Member of the Order of Australia (AM) in the 2023 Australia Day Honours List. In addition she is the recipient of two Australian Dance awards: Outstanding Achievement in Dance on Film (2001) and Services to Dance (2003). She shared the award for achievement in dance on film with Sally Jackson, with whom she had collaborated on the video documentary Boro's Ballet. She has also won an International Dance Day Award (1996), a Canberra Critics' Circle Award (1997), and two Australian Cultural Studies Awards (1998 and 2000).

Bibliography

Books
 
 
 
 — (2012). Meryl Tankard: An Original Voice. Canberra: Dance Writing and Research.
 — (2014). Dame Maggie Scott: A Life in Dance. Melbourne: Text Publishing Company.
 — (2020). Kristian Fredrikson. Designer. Melbourne: Melbourne Books.
 — (2022). Glimpses of Graeme. Reflections on the work of Graeme Murphy. Hobart: FortySouth Publishing.

Essays and reporting
 
 — (September 1993). "The Geoffrey Ingram Archive of Australian Ballet". National Library of Australia News. III (12): 11–13.
 — (Autumn 1993). "De Basil in Australia. Publicity and patronage". Dance Research. 11 (2): 16–22. 
 — (September 1994). "Régis Lansac. A photographer with theatrical flair." National Library of Australia News. IV (12): 7–10.
 — (Winter 1996). "Making Australian dance. Themes and variations". Voices. 6 (2): 10–20.
 — (December 1999). "Mutual fascination. The Ballets Russes in Australia 1936–1940". Brolga. An Australian Journal about Dance. 11: 7–15.
 — (August 2000). "A dancer's dream. Hélène Kirsova and the development of dance in Australia". National Library of Australia News. X (11): 3–6.
 — (June 2001). "Guillem's Giselle. Rediscovering an old text". Brolga. An Australian Journal about Dance. 14: 7–13.
 — (October 2001). "Giving a voice to dance". National Library of Australia News. XII (1): 14–16.
 
 — (February 2005). "The papers of Ivy Schilling". National Library of Australia News. XV (5): 12–14.
 — (July 2005). "Mir Iskusstva. Serge Diaghilev's art journal". National Library of Australia News. XV (10): 3–6.
 — (December 2005). "Challenging perceptions". National Library of Australia News. XVI (3): 12–14.
 — (April 2006). "Madame Ballet". National Library of Australia News. XVI (7): 3–6.
 
 — (Summer 2011). "The Dandré-Levitoff Russian Ballet: Australia and Beyond". Dance Research.  29 (1): 61–96.
 — (December 2011)  "Australians abroad. Ballet designs by Sidney Nolan and Arthur Boyd". The National Library Magazine. 3 (4): 21–23.
 — (March 2015)  "Undercover designs". The National Library of Australia Magazine. 7 (1): 20–23.
 — (June 2016)  "Tutu".  The National Library of Australia Magazine. 8 (2): 20–23.
 — (Summer 2016). "Robert Helpmann. Behind the scenes with the Australian Ballet, 1963–1965". Dance Research. 34 (1): 47–62.
 — (2021). "New narratives from old texts. Contemporary ballet in Australia". The Oxford Handbook of Contemporary Ballet (New York: Oxford University Press, 2021): 179–194..

References

1944 births
Living people
Dance writers
Journalists from Sydney
Australian ballerinas
Australian curators
Australian librarians
Australian women librarians
Australian women curators